Wittson Cycles is a Northern European handmade bicycle manufacturer located in Klaipeda, Lithuania. Wittson works exclusively with titanium and sources the European Grade 9 tubes from Baltic neighbor Sweden and the VSMPO Titan Scandinavia corporation, which also supplies aerospace luminaries Boeing and Airbus. Wittson uses 3/2.5 Ti for their frame production, and 6/4 Ti, which has greater tensile strength but is much harder to weld, for dropouts and bottom bracket shells, along with smaller bits such as brake cable stops.

History 
Wittson Custom Ti Cycles was founded by a famous Lithuanian pro cyclist and the coach of first, independent Lithuanian National Cycling Team Vidmantas Zukauskas. In the mid 90s Vidmantas has combined his cycling and coaching experience to start building titanium bicycle frames for such companies as Colnago, Van Tuyl, Argon18, Red Bull and many others. Later on his son Mindaugas joined him and so the name Wittson was born.

Vidmantas as a pro cyclist 
Vidmantas was born in a small village in Lithuania. His family could never afford a sports bicycle for him, but Vidmantas pursued his dream and signed up for a Cycling Sport School. This day changed his life forever as he became addicted to cycling and to this day his whole life centres around bicycles.

Vidmantas' most notable achievements as a pro cyclist:

1977 - 1st National Road Race Championships

1977 - 3rd Overall Tour of Lithuania

1979 - 3rd Overall Tour of Lithuania

1980 - 2nd Overall Tour of Lithuania

Collection

Road Race Suppresio 
Weight: 1580g (size M / seat tube uncut)

Material: grade 9 ti

Specifications:
 road race geometry
 oversized externally and internally butted headtube for conical 1.25" fork
 bi-ovalized toptube
 integrated seatpost with a support on toptube/seatstays cross section
 ti seatmast with ti bolts
 straight seatstays
 conical hydroformed chainstays
 integrated brake cable routing
 integrated shifting cable routing
 PressFit 30 bottom bracket
 made in USA PARAGON Wright dropouts with removable alu hanger
 hand brushed finish
 custom sandblasting
 ti headbadge
 anodized bolts
Compatible with: PressFit 30 bottom bracket, 31.8mm clamp band front derailleur

Road Race Disc Illuminati  

Weight: 1480g (size M)

Material: grade 9 ti

Specifications:
 road race disc geometry
 oversized conical internally butted headtube for 1.5" fork
 diamond hydroformed toptube
 oversized double butted downtube
 double butted seattube
 shallow hydroformed seatstays
 Illuminati brake bridge
 hydroformed chainstays
 integrated brake cable routing
 integrated shifting cable routing
 PressFit 30 bottom bracket
 flat disc mount
 made in USA PARAGON dropouts compatible with both DT Swiss 142 x 12mm and SHIMANO 142 x 12mm hangers
 DT Swiss 142 x 12mm thru axle removable alu hanger
 hand brushed finish
 custom sandblasting
 ti headbadge
 anodized bolts
Compatible with: integrated tapered IS42/28.6 | IS52/40 headset, PressFit 30 bottom bracket, flat mount disc brake caliper, thru axle 142 x 12mm rear hub, 31.6mm seatpost, 34.9mm clamp band front derailleur, max 28C tyre

Cross Country Bestia 
Weight: 1870g (size M / seattube uncut)

Material: grade 9 ti

Specifications:
 cross country race geometry
 oversized externally and internally butted headtube for conical 1.5" fork
 bi-ovalized toptube
 hydroformed curved downtube
 integrated seatpost with a support on toptube/seatsatays cross section
 ti seatmast with ti bolts
 hydroformed seatstays
 hydroformed chainstays
 integrated disc cable routing
 integrated shifting cable routing
 PressFit 30 bottom bracket
 made in USA PARAGON low mount dropouts with removable alu hanger
 hand brushed finish
 custom sandblasting
 ti headbadge
 anodized bolts
Compatible with: PressFit 30 bottom bracket, 34.9mm clamp band front derailleur, max 27.5/29x2.25 tyre

29er Fork Nulla 
Specifications:
 material: grade 9 ti
 weight: 1023g (steerer uncut)
 wheel size: 29"
 diameter: 1 1/8" or 1 1/8” - 1.5"
 max. tyre size: 29x3.00
 max. rotor size: 185mm
 rake: 45mm
 axle to crown: 470mm
 steerer length: 270mm
 dropouts: quick release or thru axle
 integrated brake hose
 floating postmount
 hand brushed finish
 custom sandblasting

Cyclocross Disc Fork Ele 
 material: grade 9 ti
 weight: 790g (steerer uncut)
 wheel size: 700C
 diameter: 1 1/8" or 1 1/8" - 1.25" or 1 1/8" - 1.5"
 max. tyre size: 700Cx40
 max. rotor size: 160mm
 rake: 47mm
 axle to crown: 395mm
 steerer length: 270mm
 dropouts: quick release or thru axle
 floating postmount
 hand polished
 sandblasted decals
 handcrafted in Europe

Awards and nominations

In April 2017 Wittson's Suppresio won the Campagnolo Choice Award at the Bespoked UK Handmade Bicycle Show in Bristol, UK.

In 2014 Wittson won The National Lithuanian Design Award for its Custom CX 001 bicycle. The award was handed in to Vidmantas and Mindaugas Zukauskas by Lithuanian President Dalia Grybauskaite at the Presidential Palace in Vilnius, Lithuania.

Wittson Custom CX 001 Specifications:
 cyclocross disc frame
 oversized headtube for conical 1.5" fork
 integrated seatpost with a support on toptube/seatsatays cross section
 ti seatmast
 integrated disc cable routing
 integrated shifting cable routing
 PressFit BB86
 bullet chainstays
 PARAGON low mount dropouts
 ti bolts

References

External links 
 

Mountain bike manufacturers
Cycle manufacturers of Lithuania
Bicycle framebuilders
Lithuanian companies established in 1994
Lithuanian brands